The 2020 TireRack.com Grand Prix at Road Atlanta was a sports car race sanctioned by the International Motor Sports Association (IMSA). The race was held at Road Atlanta in Braselton, Georgia on September 5th, 2020. This race was the sixth round of the 2020 WeatherTech SportsCar Championship, and the second round of the 2020 Michelin Endurance Cup.

The overall race was won by the #7 Acura Team Penske duo of Hélio Castroneves and Ricky Taylor. In LMP2, Scott Huffaker, Patrick Kelly, and Simon Trummer claimed PR1 Mathiasen Motorsports' second class victory of the season. BMW Team RLL triumphed in GTLM, scoring their second win in as many endurance races with Connor De Phillippi and Bruno Spengler behind the wheel. GTD was won by Meyer Shank Racing's #86 entry of Mario Farnbacher, Matt McMurry, and Shinya Michimi.

Background
The race was brought about as a replacement to the annual 6 Hours of Watkins Glen, which was canceled in 2020 due to New York state COVID-19 travel and gathering restrictions. In late August, Tire Rack was announced as the title sponsor of the event. After fan entry was prohibited at the previous round at VIR, spectators were allowed to attend the event, albeit subject to strict COVID-19 restrictions, including a lack of paddock access and facemask mandates.

On August 27, 2020, IMSA released their latest technical bulletin, outlining BoP for the race. In DPi, the lone change was a 15 kilogram weight reduction for the Cadillac. Similarly in GTLM, a 20 kilogram weight increase for the Porsche was the only adjustment made. In GTD, the Aston Martin received a 7.1 kilowatt increase to its average power delta, alongside increases to its turbocharger boost ratio. Several GTD cars also underwent fuel capacity adjustments. The Aston Martin, BMW, and Ferrari all received slight increases, while the Lamborghini received a one liter fuel capacity decrease.

Entries

A total of 28 cars took part in the event, split across four classes. 8 were entered in DPi, 2 in LMP2, 6 in GTLM, and 12 in GTD. Due to the endurance nature of the event, many teams drafted in a third driver, with teams in the LMP2 and GTD classes obligated to do so. Tristan Vautier, after running the majority of the early season with JDC-Miller Motorsports' #85 entry, was entered as a third driver in the #5. As a result, Stephen Simpson returned to the #85 to partner Matheus Leist. The preliminary LMP2 class list featured four entries, which reduced to two by the time the green flag dropped. Starworks Motorsport withdrew early, and were followed by Performance Tech Motorsports after travel restrictions prohibited driver Cameron Cassels from traveling to and from his native Canada. In GTD, the third driver demands forced AIM Vasser Sullivan to split the championship-contending duo of Aaron Telitz and Jack Hawksworth, placing Telitz in the #12 and leaving Hawksworth in the #14. GRT Grasser Racing Team also returned to IMSA competition, after most recently competing in the season-opening 24 Hours of Daytona. They fielded a Lamborghini for Richard Heistand, Steijn Schothorst, and Richard Westbrook.

Qualifying
Hélio Castroneves took overall pole for the event. Patrick Kelly scored pole position in LMP2, while Nick Tandy started first in GTLM. Frankie Montecalvo claimed his second pole of the season in GTD.

Qualifying results

Results

References

External links

TireRack.com Grand Prix at Road Atlanta
TireRack.com Grand Prix at Road Atlanta